Viktor Pavlovich Getmanov (born May 4, 1940 in Leselidze; died April 23, 1995 in Rostov-on-Don) was a Soviet football player.

International career
Getmanov made his debut for USSR on December 1, 1965 in a friendly against Argentina. He played in the 1966 FIFA World Cup.

Family
Viktor Getmanov was the only child of Dmitry and Anna Getmanov (née Popov).

External links
  Profile

1940 births
1995 deaths
People from Gagra District
Russian footballers
Soviet footballers
Footballers from Abkhazia
Soviet Union international footballers
1966 FIFA World Cup players
FC SKA Rostov-on-Don players
Association football defenders